John Ryan (23 March 1890 – 1 April 1943) was an Irish hurler and physician, most notable for captaining the winning Dublin team that won the 1917 All-Ireland Senior Hurling Championship.

A native of County Wexford, none of his Collegians teammates on the Dublin team were from Dublin either.

References

 

UCD hurlers
Dublin inter-county hurlers
All-Ireland Senior Hurling Championship winners
Wexford inter-county hurlers
1890 births
1943 deaths